Merle Eleanor Gold (née Tuberg) (7 March 1921- 29 September 2017) was an American astrophysicist, best known for her study of the Sun with Nobel Laureate Subrahmanyan Chandrasekhar.

Early life and education 
Merle Gold was born on 7 March 1921 and grew up in Rochester, Minnesota to Nathaniel and Eleanor Tuberg. She graduated high school in 1939 as Valedictorian of her class. She trained as a medical secretary at Mayo Clinic for two years before undertaking her undergraduate degree at University of Chicago. After graduating, she went on to complete her PhD in astrophysics under Subrahmanyan Chandrasekhar at Yerkes Observatory. Her thesis was on how absorption lines detected from the Sun vary across the solar disk.

Research and career 
In 1946, Merle was awarded a post-doctoral fellowship at University of Cambridge. She published one research paper after her thesis on the lifetimes of clusters of nebulae outside the Milky Way. In 1971, she became an editor at Cornell School of Agriculture where she worked until her retirement.

Personal life 
She married astronomer Thomas Gold in 1947 and they had 3 children together before divorcing in 1971. Merle died in Ithaca, New York on 29 September 2017.

Notable publications 

 Merle Tuberg. (November 1943). "On the Lifetime of Clusters of Extragalactic Nebulae". Astrophysical Journal. 98. 501–503. doi: 10.1086/144582
 Merle Tuberg. (March 1946). "The Variations of Absorption-Line Contours across the Solar Disc". Astrophysical Journal. 103. 145. doi: 10.1086/144799

References 

1921 births
2017 deaths
Women astrophysicists
Women astronomers
University of Chicago alumni
20th-century astronomers